Roberto Gonçalves Pinto (born 22 August 1978) is a Portuguese-German footballer who played as a midfielder.

Club career
Pinto was born in Stuttgart.

He was released by Hertha BSC in summer 2004. In January 2005, he signed an 18-month deal with Arminia Bielefeld, having been without club for six months. In summer 2007, he signed a two-year contract with Grasshopper Club Zürich.

Honours
VfB Stuttgart
 UEFA Intertoto Cup: 2000

Hertha Berlin
 DFB-Ligapokal winner: 2001, 2002

References

External links
 

Living people
1978 births
Footballers from Stuttgart
Association football midfielders
German footballers
Hertha BSC players
VfB Stuttgart players
VfB Stuttgart II players
Arminia Bielefeld players
Grasshopper Club Zürich players
SV Sandhausen players
Bundesliga players
3. Liga players
Swiss Super League players
German people of Portuguese descent
German expatriate footballers
German expatriate sportspeople in Switzerland
Expatriate footballers in Switzerland